Leonie Helen Milhomme Brinkema (born June 26, 1944) is a United States district judge of the United States District Court for the Eastern District of Virginia.

Early life and education
She was born as Leonie Milhomme in Teaneck, New Jersey.<ref>Goldman, Jessica. "Moussaoui Judge Minces No Words", CBS News, March 13, 2006. Accessed may 26, 2010.</ref> She received her Bachelor of Arts degree from Douglass College in 1966 and undertook graduate studies in philosophy at University of Michigan, Ann Arbor (1966) and New York University (1967–1969). She earned her Master of Library and Information Science degree at Rutgers University in 1970 and her Juris Doctor at Cornell Law School in 1976.

Legal career
She worked in the United States Department of Justice Criminal Division's Public Integrity Section 1976–1977, and then the United States Attorney's office in the Eastern District of Virginia, Criminal Division 1977–1983.  During 1983–1984, she returned to the Criminal Division and worked as a solo practitioner from 1984–1985.

Federal judicial career
Brinkema was a United States magistrate judge in the Eastern District of Virginia from 1985 to 1993.

On August 6, 1993, President Bill Clinton nominated Brinkema to a seat on the United States District Court for the Eastern District of Virginia vacated by Albert Vickers Bryan Jr. She was confirmed by the United States Senate on October 18, 1993, and received her commission on October 20, 1993. She took up her post on October 23, 1993.

Brinkema presided over RTC v. Lerma et al.'' (1995), a case that involved the reproduction of materials owned by the Church of Scientology. Brinkema found for the defendants in most of the claims, and awarded minimum damages of $2,500 for copyright infringement, citing the "increasingly vitriolic rhetoric" of Religious Technology Center (RTC)'s legal filings.

On October 28, 2003, she sentenced al-Qaeda operative Iyman Faris to twenty years imprisonment for providing material support to the group.

In 2006, Brinkema presided over the case of 9/11 conspirator Zacarias Moussaoui.  When she asked about the videotapes showing the interrogation of Abu Zubaydah, the government denied their existence. As she sentenced Moussaoui to life in a supermax prison, she told him: "You came here to be a martyr and to die in a great big bang of glory, but to paraphrase the poet T. S. Eliot, instead, you will die with a whimper. The rest of your life you will spend in prison." Mr. Moussaoui began to respond, but Judge Brinkema continued. "You will never again get a chance to speak," she said, "and that is an appropriate and fair ending."

On April 2, 2009, Brinkema weighed in on the question of whether terrorist detainees at the Guantanamo Bay detention camp could be prosecuted in the civilian justice system.

In 2011, she presided over the fraud trial of Lee Farkas, CEO of Taylor, Bean & Whitaker. During his sentencing hearing on June 30, 2011, she said that she did not observe any genuine remorse, and sentenced the 58-year-old Farkas to 30 years in federal prison. She ordered Farkas and six others to pay a total of about $US3.5 billion in restitution.

On January 28, 2017, she was the second to order a stay of an executive order by President Donald Trump, which restricted immigration into the United States and prevented the return of green-card holders and others. Although the order issued was a temporary restraining order, it blocked the removal of any green-card holders being detained at Dulles International Airport for seven days. Brinkema's action also ordered that lawyers have access to those held there because of the president's ban.

See also

Ali al-Tamimi
2005 CIA interrogation tapes destruction

Notes

References
 
Leonie Brinkema Biography, Tech Law Journal, last updated 1999.

External links

U.S.D.C. Eastern district of Virginia
Terrorists and Detainees: Do We Need a New National Security Court? podcast of keynote address by Leonie Brinkema at the Washington College of Law at American University, February 1, 2008.

1944 births
Living people
People from Teaneck, New Jersey
United States Department of Justice lawyers
Cornell Law School alumni
University of Michigan  College of Literature, Science, and the Arts alumni
Virginia lawyers
Rutgers University alumni
New York University alumni
Judges of the United States District Court for the Eastern District of Virginia
United States district court judges appointed by Bill Clinton
United States magistrate judges
Assistant United States Attorneys
20th-century American judges
21st-century American judges
20th-century American women judges
21st-century American women judges